Aurélie Crépeau (March 30, 1833 – December 21, 1910) was a Canadian Catholic nun. Known as Mother Youville, she founded the Grey Nuns of Nicolet.

Life
The daughter of Médard Crépeau, butcher, and Geneviève Hus-Lemoine, she was born Aurélie-Éléonore Crépeau in Sorel, Lower Canada and was educated in Berthier by the nuns of the Congregation of Notre-Dame. Crépeau taught in rural schools near her birthplace. 
In 1859, she joined the Sisters of Charity of Saint-Hyacinthe, taking her vows two years later as Sister Youville. In 1886, Bishop Elphège Gravel of Nicolet asked for the nuns to establish a new community there to do charitable work. Sister Youville was chosen to found and lead the new community. The Hôtel-Dieu De Nicolet was opened in 1889; it served as a hospital as well as a home for the old, the poor and orphans. Mother Youville served as a superior general for the Grey Nuns of Nicolet from 1886 to 1897 and from 1900 to 1903.

She died in Nicolet at the age of 77.

The Rue Aurélie-Crépeau in Nicolet was named in her honour.

References 

1833 births
1910 deaths
20th-century Canadian nuns
19th-century Canadian nuns